Advanced HeroQuest is a board game published by Games Workshop in 1989, a sequel to HeroQuest.

Description
The original HeroQuest was an adventure board game created in 1989 by Milton Bradley in conjunction with the British company Games Workshop. Later the same year, Games Workshop released Advanced HeroQuest, a similar but more complex game. Changes from HeroQuest include more complex and RPG-like rules, a modular board and the use of henchmen. The included quests feature the heroes entering a Skaven-infested dungeon in order to retrieve a magical artifact. While the only monsters included in the miniatures set are the rat men known as Skaven, statistics for all the monsters that appear in the HeroQuest game are given, and it is possible to meet some or all of them via the random generation encounter tables.

Contents
The boxed set includes:
 64-page rule book that includes four introductory scenarios
 42 plastic 25 mm miniatures and doors
 78 counters and interlocking room and corridor sections that are combined to produce modular maps

Gameplay
The game uses 12-sided dice for skill and combat resolution. Both heroes and monsters are defined by Weapon Skill, Ballistic Skill, Strength, Toughness, Wounds, Speed, Intelligence, and Bravery.

Combat is resolved in melee by rolling a target figure that is determined by the difference between the target's and player's Weapon Skills; in ranged combat, the target number is determined by how far away the target is versus the character's Ballistic Skill. In both cases, if the target number is achieved, the attacker rolls a number of dice determined by Strength and what weapon was being used. The number of dice that exceed the opponent's Toughness becomes the number of Wounds inflicted.

Expansion
An expansion to Advanced HeroQuest called Terror In The Dark was released in 1991, adding new monsters, treasures and spells.  The included quest featured the heroes being pitted against the Lichemaster, one of the adversaries from the original HeroQuest.

Reception
In the January 1990 edition  of Games International (Issue 12), Philip A. Murphy's original impression was that this was exactly the same game as the original HeroQuest, albeit produced by Games Workshop rather than Milton-Bradley. Nevertheless he admired the production values, calling all the components "a true delight and all other producers [...] could learn a lesson from GW's attention to quality components." However, Murphy did not like "the constant references, by word and image, to Warhammer this, Warhammer that, Citadel miniatures, Citadel paints, future supplements and White Dwarf magazine." While he felt that the original game by Milton-Bradley "had been rushed out of production [...] and could have been much better with more playtesting", Murphy felt that Advanced HeroQuest had the opposite problem, calling it "overproduced and a tad too complex." He concluded by giving the game an average rating of 3 out of 5, saying "it should be magnificent, and indeed at times it is. But just as often, it's a great disappointment."

The German website Spielphase gave the game a rating of 5 out of 6, saying, "You get a lot of material for your money. [...]  Even if I'm not a big fan of role-playing games or thematically related board games, I have to acknowledge that a reality is represented quite well by tables and a varied game is possible over a long period of time."

See also
 HeroQuest
 Warhammer Quest

References

External links
 Advanced Heroquest Rulebook PDF
Based on images found at this page at BoardGameGeek.com

Board games introduced in 1989
Board games with a modular board
Cooperative board games
Games Workshop games